The Maiella  (or Majella) is a massif in the Central Apennines, in Abruzzo, central Italy.

Geography 

The mountain is located at the boundary between the provinces of Chieti, Pescara and L'Aquila.

The highest peak is Monte Amaro at 2,793 m, the second-highest of the entire Apennine range. The massif is at the centre of the Maiella National Park.

The Maiella is formed by a compact limestone massif, on which summit are the highest peaks in the group: Monte Amaro 2,793 m, Monte Acquaviva 2,737 m, Monte Focalone 2,676 m, Monte Rotondo 2,656 m, Monte Macellaro 2,646 m, Pesco Falcone 2,546 m, Cima delle Murelle 2,598 m. A further peak is the Blockhaus (2,145m), which is sometimes used as the finish of a stage of the Giro d'Italia cycling race.

Vast plateaus are present up to 2,500 m. The slopes are characterized by steep valleys and gorges, carved out by rivers such as the Orfento, the Foro and others.

Nearby are the Monte Morrone, Monte Porrara and Monti Pizzi groups. The Maiella includes an iced waterfall, known as Il Principiante, located at 1,600 metres and having a height of 25 metres.

History
The massif was the site of the 1706 Abruzzo earthquake, which measured 6.8 . It devastated many towns in Abruzzo.

Scientific research 
The area of the Montagna della Maiella has been subject to a major international geoscientific research Project, TaskForceMajella from 1998 up to 2005. Along the northern slope of the mountain for thousands of years, hydrocarbon extraction has occurred from spontaneous seepages and shallow wells.

Cycling 
The Maiella, particularly the Blockhaus peak, is a popular ride for amateur cyclists and is also sometimes used for a stage of the Giro d'Italia. The first use by the race was in 1967, when Eddy Merckx won the stage. Merckx subsequently went on to establish a cycle manufacturing company and named one of his cycles after the Blockhaus. Subsequent Blockhaus stage victors were Franco Bitossi (1968), José Manuel Fuente (1972), Moreno Argentin (1984), Ivan Basso (2006), Franco Pellizotti (2009, subsequently disqualified), and Nairo Quintana (2017). The most recent inclusion of the Blockhaus on the Giro d'Italia was on 15 May 2022, when the stage was won by the Australian rider Jai Hindley.

See also
 List of European ultra prominent peaks

References

External links 
 

Apennine Mountains
Mountains of Abruzzo
Two-thousanders of Italy